Mir Bandeh Ali Khan Talpur was a politician from Sindh, Pakistan.

Mir Bandeh Ali Khan Talpur was member of first provincial assembly of sindh and Chief Minister of Sindh from 14 April 1940 to 7 March 1941.

References

Chief Ministers of Sindh
Sindhi people
Possibly living people
Sindh MPAs 1947–1951
Sindh MPAs 1937–1945